Golestan (also Romanized as Golestān; also known as Golestān-e Mashtī Vahāb) is a village in Qalandarabad Rural District, Qalandarabad District, Fariman County, Razavi Khorasan Province, Iran. At the 2006 census, its population was 129, in 32 families.

References 

Populated places in Fariman County